Poor Paul is a comedy and politically incorrect web series that stars Kevin G. Schmidt, Samantha Droke, Wes Whitworth and Zack Bennett. It was aired between 2008 and 2011. The feature film version of Poor Paul was produced in 2021 and shot on location in Rhode Island. Returning from the original cast as Grandpa Paul, Richard Riehle, followed by director and co-writer/creator Sean Michael Beyer as Paul's dad Mr. Ted, and the lovable loser/nosey neighbor Lloyd, Palmer Scott.

Summary
Poor Paul follows Paul and his college-aged roommates in an episodic comedy format.

Justin is annoyingly smart, Clyde is a neat freak and alcoholic, Bonnie is Clyde's sister who seems to like Paul, and Paul creates outrageous fantasies in order to escape life.  Paul tries to deal with Justin’s “I’m better-than-everyone” attitude and Clyde’s obsessive, compulsive side.  In Paul's fantasies he is always the hero – the only man in the universe who can save the day.

The show debuted in October 2008.

The second season of the show began in June 2009, and Jessica Lee Rose of lonelygirl15 joined the cast in September 2009.

The show was also a 2009 Webby Awards honoree for best writing.

Characters
 Paul (Zack Bennett)
 Justin (Kevin G. Schmidt)
 Clyde (Nicholas Braun, Wes Whitworth)
 Bonnie (Samantha Droke)
 Grandpa Paul (Richard Riehle)
 John (Kendall Schmidt)
 Lloyd (Palmer Scott)
 Mr. Ted (Sean Michael Beyer)
 Patricia (Whitmer Thomas)
 Beatrice (Jessica Lee Rose)
 Fantasy Woman (Floriana Lima)

Episodes

References

External links
 Poor Paul - Official Page
 Poor Paul Blip.TV
 

2008 web series debuts
American comedy web series
YouTube original programming